San Francisco District may refer to:

 Peru:
 San Francisco District, Ambo
 Panama:
 San Francisco District, Panama
 Costa Rica:
 San Francisco District, Cartago (also known as Aguacaliente), in Cartago Canton, Cartago province
 San Francisco District, Goicoechea, in Goicoechea Canton, San José province
 San Francisco District, Heredia, in Heredia Canton, Heredia province
 San Francisco District, San Isidro, in San Isidro Canton, Heredia province

See also
 San Francisco (disambiguation)

District name disambiguation pages